The March 18–21, 1958 nor'easter was an unusual late-season winter storm that impacted the Mid-Atlantic and New England regions of the United States. Its snowfall extended from North Carolina through Maine.

See also

Climate of the United States
List of NESIS storms

References

Nor'easters
1958 meteorology
Natural disasters in Pennsylvania
March 1958 events in the United States
1958 in Maine
1958 in North Carolina
1958 natural disasters in the United States